The Addams Family is a 1991 American supernatural black comedy film based on the characters from the cartoon created by cartoonist Charles Addams and the 1964 TV series produced by David Levy. Directed by former cinematographer Barry Sonnenfeld in his screen directing debut, the film stars Anjelica Huston, who was nominated for a Golden Globe for her performance as Morticia Addams, Raul Julia as Gomez Addams, and Christopher Lloyd as Fester Addams. The film focuses on a bizarre, macabre, aristocratic family who reconnect with whom they believe to be a long-lost relative, Gomez's brother Fester Addams.

The film was noted for its turbulent production; originally developed at Orion, the film went $5 million over budget due to constant rewrites throughout shooting; health problems of people involved in the filming and an overall stressful filming for Sonnenfeld himself, which caused multiple delays. The rise in production costs from the film's $25 million budget to $30 million led Orion,  financially struggling and fearful of another big-budget flop, to sell the film to Paramount, who completed the film and handled the film's domestic distribution, while Orion distributed the film internationally through Columbia Pictures. The film was commercially successful, making back almost seven times its production costs, and was followed by a sequel, Addams Family Values, two years later.

Plot
Gomez Addams laments the 25-year absence of his brother Fester, who disappeared after the two had a falling-out. Gomez's lawyer Tully Alford owes money to loan shark/con artist Abigail Craven, and notices that her adopted son Gordon closely resembles Fester. Tully proposes that Gordon pose as Fester to infiltrate the Addams household and find the hidden vault where they keep their vast riches. Tully and his wife Margaret attend a séance at the Addams home led by Grandmama in which the family tries to contact Fester's spirit. Gordon arrives, posing as Fester, while Abigail poses as a German psychiatrist named Dr. Greta Pinder-Schloss and tells the family that Fester had been lost in the Bermuda Triangle for the past 25 years until she found him in some tuna nets.

Gomez, overjoyed to have "Fester" back, takes him to the family vault to view home movies from their childhood. Gordon learns the reason for the brothers' falling-out: Gomez was jealous of Fester's success with women, and wooed the conjoined twins Flora and Fauna Amor away from him out of envy. Gomez starts to suspect that "Fester" is an impostor when he is unable to recall important details about their past. Gordon attempts to return to the vault, but is unable to get past a booby trap. Gomez's wife Morticia reminds "Fester" of the importance of family among the Addamses and of their vengeance against those who cross them. Fearing that the family is getting wise to their con, Abigail (under the guise of Dr. Pinder-Schloss) convinces Gomez that his suspicions are due to displacement.

Gordon grows closer to the Addams family, particularly the children Wednesday and Pugsley, whom he helps to prepare a swordplay sequence for a school play. Abigail had insisted that Gordon not attend the play, but after feeling deeply saddened by this, he attends anyway. After the play, Dr. Pinder-Schloss insists that "Fester" must once again leave, so the Addamses throw a large party with their extended family and friends, during which Abigail plans to break into the vault. Wednesday overhears Abigail and Gordon discussing the plan, and escapes them by hiding in the family cemetery. Tully learns that as the elder brother, Fester is the executor of the Addams estate and therefore technically owns the entire property. With help from the Addamses' neighbor Judge George Womack, whom Gomez has repeatedly infuriated by hitting golf balls into his house, Tully procures a restraining order against the family, banning them from the estate. Gomez attempts to fight the order in court, but Judge Womack rules against him out of spite.

While Abigail, Gordon, and Tully try repeatedly and unsuccessfully to get past the booby trap blocking access to the vault, the Addamses are forced to move into a motel and find jobs. Morticia tries to be a preschool teacher, Wednesday and Pugsley sell toxic lemonade, and Thing—the family's animated disembodied hand—becomes a courier. Despondent, Gomez sinks into depression and lethargy.

Morticia returns to the Addams home to confront Gordon and is captured by Abigail and Tully, who torture her in an attempt to learn how to access the vault. Thing observes this and informs Gomez, using Morse code, who then rushes to Morticia's rescue. Abigail threatens Morticia's life if Gomez does not surrender the family fortune. Fed up with his mother's behavior and constant berating, Gordon turns against her. Using a magical book which projects its contents into reality, he unleashes a hurricane into the house, which strikes his own head with lightning and launches Tully and Abigail out of a window and into open graves dug for them by Wednesday and Pugsley.

The movie ends with a coda, taking place seven months later at Halloween. The family states that Gordon was really Fester all along, and that the previously made-up story about Fester being found in the tuna nets after being lost in the Bermuda Triangle is true. They further state that Fester had suffered from amnesia the whole time and only recovered his memories after being struck by lightning. With the family whole again as they play "Wake the Dead", Morticia informs Gomez that she is pregnant.

Cast
 Anjelica Huston as Morticia Addams
 Raul Julia as Gomez Addams
 Christopher Lloyd as Uncle Fester Addams / Gordon Craven
 Christina Ricci as Wednesday Addams
 Jimmy Workman as Pugsley Addams
 Judith Malina as Grandmama
 Carel Struycken as Lurch
 Christopher Hart as Thing
 John Franklin as Cousin Itt
 Elizabeth Wilson as Abigail Craven
 Dan Hedaya as Tully Alford
 Dana Ivey as Margaret Alford
 Paul Benedict as Judge George Womack
 Allegra Kent as Cousin Ophelia Frump
 Mercedes McNab as Girl Scout
 Sally Jessy Raphael as Herself

Barry Sonnenfeld makes an uncredited cameo as a passenger on Gomez's train.

Production

Pre-production
Scott Rudin, a development executive at 20th Century Fox, pitched to the studio an adaptation of Charles Addams' The Addams Family cartoons, and the studio enthusiastically agreed that the cartoons would make a good film, and set out to purchase the rights. However, Fox would ultimately not make the film, as Orion Pictures, who owned the film rights to The Addams Family, would not sell the property, as they were planning on producing a rebooted TV series. Further crucial property rights were owned by Charles Addams' widow. Another difficulty in getting the film produced was the relative obscurity of The Addams Family 1964 TV series, as compared to the better-known (due to syndication) series, The Munsters. The production finally moved forward when Addams' widow sold the remaining rights to Orion, who put the film in production with Rudin producing. Tim Burton and Terry Gilliam were approached to direct the film but both declined.

Casting
Anjelica Huston said she based aspects of her performance on her friend Jerry Hall to give the character more warmth. Huston said she would have expected the role to go to Cher, but was a longtime fan of Morticia.

Writing
Caroline Thompson and Larry Wilson wrote the first draft of the screenplay, which was extensively rewritten later by other writers, including Paul Rudnick, who later wrote Addams Family Values.

In a 2012 interview, Sonnenfeld recalled that he had originally intended that it be unclear whether Fester really was an imposter or not, but the actors strongly opposed the notion and selected then 10-year-old  Christina Ricci ("Wednesday Addams") to speak on their behalf. Ricci "gave this really impassioned plea that Fester shouldn't be an imposter... so we ended up totally changing that plot point to make the actors happy. And they were right – it was the better way to go".

Special effects
Makeup and animatronic effects for the film were handled by Tony Gardner and his company Alterian, Inc.

Filming
After Tim Burton passed on directing the film because he was busy filming Batman Returns, the sequel to the 1989 film Batman, at the time, Barry Sonnenfeld took the job. According to Sonnenfeld, Terry Gilliam was also offered to direct the film, which he turned down. His first directing job after previously serving as director of photography for several major films, Sonnenfeld experienced much stress during filming. Most of the film was shot on Stage 3/8 at the Hollywood Center Studios in Los Angeles, the same studio where the original TV series was filmed. In the last three months of production, director of photography Owen Roizman quit, and was replaced by Gale Tattersall. Filming resumed, but within weeks Tattersall was rushed to the hospital, halting production while Sonnenfeld took over cinematography, while simultaneously directing the film. Further delays occurred when a blood vessel in actor Raul Julia's eye burst, leading the production to film around Julia until he recovered, and Sonnenfeld's wife became sick, halting production.

In her 2014 memoir Watch Me, Anjelica Huston described the filming of the Addams Family as "long and arduous". It was decided that the character of Morticia should have eyes which slanted upwards at the sides, an effect which was achieved by attaching an elastic strap to the back of Huston's head via fabric tabs glued at her temples, which pulled the corners of her eyes upwards. A second strap was added to balance the appearance of the lower part of her face with the upper. The bands caused extended discomfort to Huston, and, unless she removed them at lunchtime, she would suffer severe headaches and rashes later in the day. Removing the bands for a break entailed hours of extra work in both removing and then re-applying her makeup and wig. On top of this, the bands would snap at the slightest turn of Huston's head, causing yet more grueling repair time. Eventually, she learned to pivot and turn on her feet without moving her upper body or head. According to Huston, actress Judith Malina's way of enduring being "embedded in latex for over twelve hours a day" was to "smoke an endless series of joints in her trailer throughout filming".

Another production difficulty was the financial decline of original production studio Orion Pictures, who, while having recently made the big hits The Silence of the Lambs and Dances with Wolves, had also produced several major flops which ate up the studios' funds, leading Orion to sell The Addams Family, while still in production, to Paramount Pictures. In exchange, Paramount would own the domestic rights, as Orion had pre-sold the international rights to Columbia. Part of Orion's motivation to sell the film was that the film, originally budgeted at $25 million, had gone $5 million over budget due to newly added material as a result of the film's numerous rewrites. With the projected release date competing with Steven Spielberg's Hook, Orion feared that The Addams Family would be another expensive flop, and decided to cut its losses. Ultimately, The Addams Family was a box-office hit. As the sale occurred late in production, the filmmakers were unaware that Paramount had taken over production, learning of the sale from a journalist rather than either of the studios.

Post-production
The film was further shaped by test screenings. The Mamushka sequence, a musical dance number, was significantly longer in the original cut, but was shortened following negative responses from test audiences.

Music

The Addams Family: Soundtrack was produced by Hummie Mann and Marc Shaiman. It was orchestrated by Hummie Mann and composed by Duke Ellington, Irving Mills, Marc Shaiman and  Saxie Dowell. It was released on December 3, 1991 by Capitol Records. "Addams Groove" by MC Hammer was the theme song for the movie and the music video was played prior to the film.

Release
The Addams Family grossed $113,502,426 in the United States and $191,502,426 worldwide, turning a significant profit against the $30 million production costs.

Lawsuit
Another obstacle in releasing the film occurred when, as the studios prepared the film for release, David Levy, a  producer of the original 1960s TV series, filed a lawsuit against Paramount Pictures, claiming that the film infringed on his property rights. The suit was eventually settled out of court, after the film's release, due to Paramount greenlighting a sequel after the first film's success.

Home media
Ownership issues surrounding the film (with domestic rights being handled by Paramount and international rights held by Orion's successor-in-interest Metro-Goldwyn-Mayer), kept the film out of print overseas after its initial VHS release, which were not resolved until 2013. In 1993, McDonald's sold low-cost, exclusive VHS editions of The Addams Family and Wayne's World to coincide with the theatrical releases of Addams Family Values and Wayne's World 2, as part of an exclusive distribution deal with Paramount Home Entertainment. Paramount Home Entertainment released the film on DVD in 2000; this release contained only two trailers as bonus features. The film was reissued in a double feature with Addams Family Values in 2006. Warner Home Video released the film on Blu-ray in the United States on September 9, 2014; Warner Bros. Home Entertainment (under license from MGM) also released the film on Blu-ray internationally. In October 2019, Paramount Pictures released a double-feature Blu-ray of The Addams Family and Addams Family Values, along with single releases of each film. In November 2021, the film was re-released on Blu-ray & Ultra HD Blu-ray with an extended version of the Mamushka sequence.

Reception
On review aggregation website Rotten Tomatoes, the film has an approval rating of 67% based on 51 reviews, with an average rating of 5.80/10. The website's critical consensus reads: "The movie is peppered with amusing sight gags and one-liners, but the disjointed script doesn't cohere into a successful whole". On Metacritic, the film has a weighted average score of 57 out of 100 based on 19 critics, indicating "mixed or average reviews". Audiences polled by CinemaScore gave the film an average grade of "B" on an A+ to F scale.

Roger Ebert gave the film 2 out of 4 stars, saying it was mildly entertaining but did not add up to much. Jonathan Rosenbaum of the Chicago Reader called the film a "collection of one-liners and not much more". Variety magazine wrote: "Despite inspired casting and nifty visual trappings, the eagerly awaited Addams Family figures a major disappointment". According to the BBC, "it is the top-notch cast that elevates this film from flimsy to sheer delight".

Accolades
The Addams Family was awarded Best Horror Film of the Year in 1991 by the Horror Hall of Fame. Carel Struycken appeared at the award ceremony to receive the award on behalf of the cast. Huston was nominated for the Golden Globe Award for Best Actress – Motion Picture Musical or Comedy for her performance as Morticia. The film was nominated for an Academy Award for achievement in costume design. The film won a Golden Raspberry Award for Worst Original Song for the song "Addams Groove" by MC Hammer. The film also won an award for Favorite Movie at 1992 Kids' Choice Awards.

Other media

Documentary
A documentary, The Making of The Addams Family, was produced to promote the film in 1991.

Video game
Several video games based on the film were released for various console, handheld, and home computer platforms.

Pinball
The Addams Family was a commercial arcade pinball machine made by Bally/Williams and was released in March 1992. It became the best selling pinball machine of all time, with more than 20,000 units sold. The pinball was digitally re-released on The Pinball Arcade in February 2015 until June 2018.

References

External links

 
 
 
 
 Paramount Movies
 Paramount Movies - New Double Feature

1990s black comedy films
1990s comedy horror films
1990s English-language films
1990s fantasy comedy films
1991 comedy films
1991 directorial debut films
1991 fantasy films
1991 films
The Addams Family films
American black comedy films
American comedy horror films
American fantasy comedy films
Films about amnesia
American films about Halloween
Films about witchcraft
Films based on television series
Films directed by Barry Sonnenfeld
Films produced by Scott Rudin
Films scored by Marc Shaiman
Films set in country houses
Films shot in Los Angeles
Films with screenplays by Caroline Thompson
Films with screenplays by Larry Wilson (screenwriter)
Golden Raspberry Award winning films
Orion Pictures films
Paramount Pictures films
American supernatural comedy films
Mad scientist films
1990s American films